Charlie Wassmer (born 21 March 1991) is an English semi-professional footballer who plays as a defender for Hayes & Yeading United. Wassmer started his career at Hayes & Yeading United FC before catching the eye of Crawley Town – where he won promotion into EFL League One. In 2017–18, at Hampton & Richmond Borough, Wassmer was named in the National League South team of the year after netting 8 goals from centre back. Wassmer has also spent loan spells at Harrow Borough and Fleetwood Town.

Career
Wassmer progressed through the youth teams at Hayes & Yeading United, making his debut on 13 April 2010 in a Conference National match at Salisbury City. Although just 19 years of age, Wassmer was a regular fixture in the Hayes & Yeading United defence throughout the following campaign. Wassmer's impressive performances caught the eye of Crawley Town, who at the time held first place in the Conference.

On 21 December 2012, Wassmer left the club, and on 16 January 2013 he joined Cambridge United until the end of the season.

On 27 July 2013, Wassmer played in a friendly for former club Hayes & Yeading United and the match ended as a 3–1 victory over Wealdstone. In August, he was officially announced to have made his permanent return to the club and joined up with the first team straight away.

On 6 February 2014, Wassmer left Hayes & Yeading United and joined Margate of the Isthmian League Premier Division.

On 8 June 2018, Wassmer went on to sign for National League South side Woking, after having spells at Maidenhead United and Hampton & Richmond Borough After a prolonged injury problem, Wassmer made his Woking debut in early September, coming off the bench during a 1–1 draw with Concord Rangers. Following this, Wassmer went onto enjoy loan spells at both Metropolitan Police and Leatherhead to gain match fitness.

Shortly after his loan spell at Leatherhead came to an end, Wassmer went on to join National League side Maidstone on loan for 2 months.

On 25 January 2019 it was confirmed that Billericay had signed Wassmer.

On 22 November 2019, after enjoying a loan spell with the club, Wassmer joined National League South side Hampton & Richmond Borough for the third time. On 9 January 2022, the club released a statement saying that Wassmer’s contract had been terminated due to an incident which took place during their fixture with Slough Town on 28 December 2021.

On 14 January 2022, following his release from Hampton, Wassmer returned to Hayes & Yeading United.

Career statistics

References

External links

1991 births
Living people
Footballers from Hammersmith
English footballers
Association football defenders
Hayes & Yeading United F.C. players
Harrow Borough F.C. players
Crawley Town F.C. players
Fleetwood Town F.C. players
Dagenham & Redbridge F.C. players
Cambridge United F.C. players
Margate F.C. players
Maidenhead United F.C. players
Gosport Borough F.C. players
Kingstonian F.C. players
Hampton & Richmond Borough F.C. players
Woking F.C. players
Metropolitan Police F.C. players
Leatherhead F.C. players
Maidstone United F.C. players
Billericay Town F.C. players
National League (English football) players
English Football League players